Downton is a civil parish in Herefordshire, located in the north of the county and containing the village of Downton-on-the-Rock. It is part of the Leintwardine group of parishes and shares a parish council with Leintwardine and Burrington. In the Domesday Book Downton is referred to as "Duntune", meaning "hill settlement". At Downton Gorge the River Teme cuts through a limestone ridge; above the gorge is Downton Castle, an 18th-century country house with a tower built to resemble a castle.

References

External links
 A History of The Downton Estate and Downton Shoot

Civil parishes in Herefordshire
Villages in Herefordshire